Carlos Garcia is a former mayor of Pico Rivera, California.

Garcia was elected to the Pico Rivera City Council in 1997 and served as the mayor in 1999 and 2004 until being voted out in 2007. He's served as a delegate to the League of California Cities, an alternate director of the Southeast Area Animal Control Authority, and director of the Southeast Area Social Services Funding Authority. Prior to his run on the council he served on the Pico Rivera Planning Commission.

Garcia is president and CEO of EndPak Packaging in Pico Rivera, which he founded with his brother Edgar. It was ranked 77th by Print Packaging magazine and recognized by Hispanic Magazine as one of the top 100 Hispanic-owned and operated businesses in the country. He has three children and two grandchildren.

References

Living people
Mayors of places in California
People from Pico Rivera, California
Year of birth missing (living people)
California city council members
Place of birth missing (living people)
Businesspeople from California
Mayors of Pico Rivera, California
Hispanic and Latino American mayors in California